The Partridge River is a river in the Yukon and British Columbia, Canada. It is in the Bering Sea drainage basin and is a tributary of Bennett Lake.

Course
It takes in an unnamed tributary from the right, heads northeast through Partridge Lake, where it passes into the Yukon, and reaches its mouth on the West Arm of Bennett Lake. Bennett Lake flows via the Nares River, the Tagish River and the Yukon River to the Bering Sea.

Tributaries
Lemieux Creek (right)
Jones Creek (left)

References

Rivers of the Boundary Ranges
Rivers of Yukon